Layalestan Rural District is a rural district (dehestan) in the Central District of Lahijan County, Gilan Province, Iran. At the 2006 census, its population was 12,993, in 3,893 families. The rural district has 18 villages.

References 

Rural Districts of Gilan Province
Lahijan County